M/T Brillante Virtuoso was a Greek-owned, Liberian-flagged suezmax tanker damaged beyond repair as part of an insurance fraud, which involved a faked hijacking by Yemenis posing as Somali pirates in the Gulf of Aden on 6 July 2011. A British High Court found that the faked attack was orchestrated and instigated by the vessel's beneficial owner, Marios Iliopoulos, who was at the time experiencing significant financial difficulties. As of 2022, Iliopoulos has not faced criminal prosecution for his role in the staged attack on the Brillante Virtuoso.

David Mockett, a British marine shipping surveyor and consultant who was investigating the incident, was reported to have believed that the attack on the Brillante Virtuoso was carried out by a criminal gang as part of an insurance fraud. According to the testimony of the ship's crew members, Iliopoulos and his employees were aware that Mockett's investigation had come to disagree with Iliopoulos' insurance claim. Before he could act further, Mockett was killed by a car bomb in Yemen on 20 July 2011. As of 2022, his murder remains unsolved.

A book on the events surrounding the ship by Bloomberg reporters Matthew Campbell and Kit Chellel, entitled Dead in the Water: A True Story of Hijacking, Murder, and a Global Maritime Conspiracy, was published in 2022.

Ship history
The ship was built by Samsung Shipbuilding & Heavy Industries in Geoje, South Korea, in 1992. Originally named St. Romauld, she was soon renamed Nandu, then to Stainless in 2005, before becoming Brilliante Virtuoso in 2008. In 2011 she was registered in the Marshall Islands, and flying the flag of Liberia.

2011 incident
Early on 6 July 2011, the ship was en route from Kerch, Ukraine, to Qingdao, China, with a cargo of fuel oil worth $100 million. The guided missile cruiser , operating as part of the Combined Maritime Forces, responded and rescued the crew of 26, all Filipinos, but found no evidence of pirates. The ship's owners, Suez Fortune Investment Ltd., based in Greece, sent two tugboats from Aden to extinguish the fire and tow the vessel to safety. Subsequent surveys showed no signs of RPG damage or small arms fire penetration from outside, but evidence that AK-47s had been fired inside the ship.

Initial investigations
David Mockett, a British marine shipping surveyor and consultant, who was investigating the incident, was reported to have believed that the attack on Brillante Virtuoso was carried out by a criminal gang as part of an insurance fraud. Before he could act further, Mockett was killed by a car bomb in Yemen on 20 July 2011.

In the years after the alleged attack the insurers of the ship expressed doubt that the incident was caused by Somali pirates. They noted discrepancies in the captain's handling of the ship in dangerous waters versus what was standard practice. Investigation of the ship also suggested a deliberate fire raising rather than due to use of weapons.

Court case
On 7 October 2019, a High Court judge, Mr Justice Teare, ruled after a 52-day trial of the claim brought against the vessel's war risk underwriters that the so-called pirate attack was no such thing, and that the whole enterprise was a fake, and was orchestrated and instigated by the vessel's beneficial owner, Marios Iliopoulos, who was at the time experiencing significant financial difficulties. Co-conspirators included the master and chief engineer of the vessel, the local salvors, Poseidon Salvage (in particular Vassilios Vergos), and the hired "pirates," who were in fact present or former members of the Yemeni coast guard or navy.

On the 24 October 2021, Sir Gary Streeter (Member of Parliament for South West Devon) raised the matter in Parliament and summarised his views: 'First, I will set out the background to the matter, and the link between the murder of Captain Mockett and the commercial court case of the Brillante Virtuoso. Secondly, I will set out the many attempts that the family have made to seek justice, and the failings of our prosecuting authorities. Finally, I will spell out the steps that we wish the Minister to take to achieve justice for my constituents.'

Aftermath
In February and March 2022, BBC Radio Four broadcast three programmes on this matter. 

Veteran Bloomberg journalists Matthew Campbell and Kit Chellel built upon their 2017 article to release their 2022 book Dead in the Water: A True Story of Hijacking, Murder, and a Global Maritime Conspiracy.

References

External links

1992 ships
Ships built by Samsung Heavy Industries
Oil tankers
Maritime incidents in 2011